"Da la Vuelta" (English: "Turn Around") is a song written by Emilio Estefan and Kike Santander and performed by American singer Marc Anthony. Produced by Anthony, Estefan, and Ángel "Cucco" Peña, it is a salsa track which deals with the singer letting go of his former lover. It is one of the three Spanish-language songs to be included on Anthony's 1999 self-titled album and was released as a promotional single in the same year.

Despite the album being met with unfavorable reviews, "Da la Vuelta" garnered positive reactions from music critics who praised it as a danceable number. The record received a Latin Grammy nomination for Best Tropical Song in 2000 and was nominated for Tropical Song of the Year at the Lo Nuestro Awards the following year. Commercially, it reached number 22 and number six on the Billboard Hot Latin Songs and Tropical Songs charts in the United States respectively.

Music, lyrics, and release

"Da la Vuelta" is a salsa track composed by Emilio Estefan and Kike Santander and produced by Anthony, Estefan, and Ángel "Cucco" Peña. Peña had previously collaborated with Anthony as a producer for his third studio album Contra la Corriente in 1997. It is one of the three Spanish-language records included on Marc Anthony along with the Spanish-language versions of "I Need to Know" ("Dímelo") and "She's Been Good to Me" ("Cómo Ella Me Quiere a Mi"). The song begins as a "soft ballad" with a bolero guitar and mariachi horn arrangements before transitioning into a salsa number. Lyrically, it is about the singer letting go of his former lover. "Da la Vuelta" was released as a promotional single for the album in 1999. Anthony performed the song live at Madison Square Garden; this performance was included on the video set The Concert from Madison Square Garden.

Reception
The Richmond Times-Dispatch journalist Melissa Ruggierit called "Da la Vuelta" a "traditional romp co-written by Emilio Estefan that is a scorcher." Chloe Cabrera of The Tampa Tribune felt that "Da la Vuelta", along with "Dímelo", has "the feel of his Grammy-award winning 1997 album, Contra la Corriente." Mario Tarradell, who gave Marc Anthony a negative review on The Dallas Morning News, lamented that the record was filled with ballads instead of dance numbers like "Da la Vuelta", "Dímelo", and "That's Okay". However, he also remarked that "we know he can do the salsa stuff" and insisted that they were "not a challenge" for Anthony. Parry Gettelman, who also wrote an unfavorable review of the album, mentioned that "Da la Vuelta" was "certainly worthy of Anthony's voice."

The Dayton Daily News editor Sofia Villalobos opined that the track "combines an older, Tito Puente style with the latest fads of the aforementioned Lopez. Similarly, The San Diego Union-Tribune writer Ernesto Portillo, Jr. called it a "danceable salsa number" while Rueben Rosario highlighted the record as "hip-grinding" and "vintage Anthony" on St. Paul Pioneer Press. Grace Bastidas of The Village Voice praised it as a "beautiful little letting-go number".

"Da la Vuelta" received a nomination for Best Tropical Song at the inaugural Latin Grammy Awards in 2000, which was awarded to "El Niágara en Bicicleta" by Juan Luis Guerra. It also was nominated Tropical Song of the Year at the 13th Annual Lo Nuestro Awards in 2001 but lost to "A Puro Dolor" by Son by Four. Santander and Estefan were presented with a BMI Latin Award in 2001 as it was recognized as the one of the best-performing songs of the year. The track was included on Anthony's greatest hits album Sigo Siendo Yo: Grandes Exitos (2006).

Commercially, "Da la Vuelta" peaked at number 22 on the Billboard Hot Latin Songs chart in the United States. It fared better on the Billboard Latin Tropical Songs chart by reaching number 6 and ended 2000 as the ninth best-performing tropical song of the year in the country.

Charts

Weekly charts

Year-end charts

Personnel
Credits adapted from the Marc Anthony liner notes.

 Marc Anthony – arrangement, co-production, vocals
 Luis Aquina – trumpet
 Joe Caldas – audio engineer
 Wichy Camacho – background vocals
 Enrique Collazo  – violin
 Antonio Salcedo Corpas – string contractor
 J. Dederic – violin
 Jorge Diaz – trombone
 Emilio Estefan – co-production, songwriting
 Tito de Garcia – bongos, timbales
 Jose Gazmei – bass
 Orlando Guillot – cello
 Henry Hutchinson  – violin
 José Janga  – violin
 Gerardo Lopez – audio engineer
 Tony Mardini – assistant audio engineer
 Emma Matos – violin
 Fernando Medina  – violin
 Naldi Morales – cello
 Fernando Muscolo – keyboards
 Ángel "Cucco" Peña – arrangement, co-production
 Lito Peña, Jr. – assistant audio engineer
 Charlie Sierra – percussion
 Kachiro Thompson – conga
 Rafi Torres – trombone
 Chequi Ramos – background vocals
 Hector I. Rosa – audio engineer
 Josue Rosado – background vocals
 Sheila Ortiz – cello
 Fermin Segarra – cello
 Maximo Torres – guitar
 Victor Vasquez – trombone
 Chris Wiggins – assistant audio engineer

References

1999 singles
1999 songs
Marc Anthony songs
Songs written by Kike Santander
Songs written by Emilio Estefan
Song recordings produced by Emilio Estefan
Columbia Records singles
Spanish-language songs